The 1987 World Touring Car Championship season was the inaugural World Touring Car Championship season. It commenced on 22 March 1987 and ended on 15 November after eleven races. The championship was open to Touring Cars complying with FIA Group A regulations. The Drivers title was won by Roberto Ravaglia in a BMW M3 and the Entrants title by Eggenberger Motorsport in a Ford Sierra Cosworth No 7.

Teams and drivers

Fifteen registered entries were received for the championship. Regulations imposed by last minute series promoter Bernie Ecclestone dictated that for teams to receive official points and prize money they must have paid the US$60,000 registration fee. This in fact saw a number of the top teams, most notably Tom Walkinshaw Racing who had been the team to beat in the 1984, 1985 and 1986 European Touring Car Championships, refuse to pay and virtually ignore the championship.

Among those who did commit to the championship were the Ford Europe backed Eggenberger Motorsport with their Texaco sponsored Ford Sierra turbo's, Andy Rouse's team who ran their own  Ford Sierra Cosworth, the factory backed BMW teams of West Germany's Schnitzer Motorsport and the Italian CiBiEmme and Bigazzi teams racing the new BMW M3 which had replaced the old 635 CSi as BMW's main challenger, and the Alfa Corse team with their factory Alfa Romeo 75 turbo's.

Although numerous other entries competed in races during the season only the following were eligible to score championship points. Ironically, two outright race winning teams in the championship were not eligible for championship points. Cars competed in three engine capacity divisions:
 Division 1: up to 1600 cm3
 Division 2: 1601 to 2500 cm3
 Division 3: Over 2500 cm3

Calendar
Drivers in Italics were listed as a driver in the car but did not actually drive that car in the race.

Note: "Overall winner" in the above table refers to the overall race winner and "Winner championship" refers to the highest placed entry which had been registered for the championship.

Results and standings

Races

Standings

Drivers' Championship

Note: Race placings in the above table refer to the relative placings gained by registered championship entries and does not include other competitors.

Point system: 20-15-12-10-8-6-4-3-2-1 awarded to the top ten finishers for both outright and divisional results. Therefore, a driver could be awarded up to 40 points in a race. Points were only allocated to drivers of cars registered for the World Championship.

Entrants Championship

Point system: 20-15-12-10-8-6-4-3-2-1 awarded to the top ten finishers for both outright and divisional results. Therefore, an entry could be awarded up to 40 points in a race. Points were allocated only to entries which were registered for the World Championship.

See also
 Group A

References
  
 1987 World Touring Car Championship - from History of the European Touring Car Championship
 1987 World Touring Car Championship - Touring Car Racing.net

External links
 1987 WTCC race results Retrieved from Motorsport Almanac on 30 September 2008
 Images from 1987 WTCC Round 5 – Spa 24 Hour – Spa Francorchamps Retrieved from Racing Sports Cars on 30 September 2008
 Images from 1987 WTCC Round 7 – Tourist Trophy - Silverstone Retrieved from Racing Sports Cars on 30 September 2008
 Images from 1987 WTCC Round 8 – James Hardie 1000 -  Bathurst Retrieved from Autopics on 30 September 2008
 ONCE UPON A TIME… IN JAPAN